The 1958 Western Illinois Leathernecks football team represented Western Illinois University as a member of the Interstate Intercollegiate Athletic Conference (IIAC) during the 1958 NCAA College Division football season. They were led by second-year head coach Lou Saban and played their home games at Hanson Field. The Leathernecks finished the season with a 6–1–1 record overall and a 5–1 record in conference play, winning the IIAC title.

Schedule

References

Western Illinois
Western Illinois Leathernecks football seasons
Interstate Intercollegiate Athletic Conference football champion seasons
Western Illinois Leathernecks football